Salas District is one of twelve districts of the province Lambayeque in Peru.

References